Okhansk is a town and the administrative center of Okhansky District in Perm Krai, Russia, located on the right bank of the Kama River,  southwest of Perm, the administrative center of the krai. Population:

History
First mentioned in 1597 as the village of Okhannoye, it was also called Okhanskoye or Okhan. Town status was granted to it in 1781.

Administrative and municipal status
Within the framework of administrative divisions, Okhansk serves as the administrative center of Okhansky District, to which it is directly subordinated. As a municipal division, the town of Okhansk is incorporated within Okhansky Municipal District as Okhanskoye Urban Settlement.

References

Notes

Sources

Cities and towns in Perm Krai
Populated places in Okhansky District
Okhansky Uyezd
Populated places on the Kama River